San Marino competed at the 2009 World Championships in Athletics from 15–23 August 2009. A team of 2 athletes was announced in preparation for the competition.

Team selection
Track and road events

References
Entry list. European Athletic Association (2009-07-30). Retrieved on 2009-08-16.

External links
Official competition website

Nations at the 2009 World Championships in Athletics
World Championships in Athletics
San Marino at the World Championships in Athletics